This list contains famous or notable musicians, singers, composers and bands who originated in or are associated strongly with Glasgow, Scotland.

0-9
1990s

A
AC Acoustics
Admiral Fallow
Adopted as Holograph
Adventures in Stereo
Aereogramme
Altered Images
Angel Heart
Craig Armstrong
Attic Lights

B
Baby Chaos (briefly changed name to Deckard)
Baby Strange
A Band Called Quinn
Jimmy Barnes
The Bathers
Beecake
Beggars Opera
Belle & Sebastian
Bis
Bleed From Within
The Blimp
The Blue Nile
The Bluebells
Bombay Talkie
Brian Robertson (former Thin Lizzy Guitarist)
Scott Brown

C
Camera Obscura

Junior Campbell, also member of The Marmalade
Cannon
Cado Belle
Catbuster
Charlie and the Bhoys
Chvrches
The Cinematics
Billy Connolly
Ivor Cutler

D
Dananananaykroyd
Darius Danesh
Deacon Blue
Del Amitri
Jimmy Dewar, from Robin Trower band
Jim Diamond
Donovan

E
Endgames
Errors

F
Franz Ferdinand
The Fratellis
Frightened Rabbit
Future Pilot A.K.A.

G
Ganger
The Gangsters
Ron Geesin
Glasvegas
Gun

H
H2O
Alex Harvey of The Sensational Alex Harvey Band
Hip Parade
Hipsway
How to Swim
Horse
RM Hubbert

I
Isosceles

J
Jacob Yates and the Pearly Gate Lock Pickers
Bert Jansch

K
King King
David Knopfler of Dire Straits
Mark Knopfler of Dire Straits
Kode9

L
Laki Mera
Mary Lee
Life Without Buildings
Little Eye
Lloyd Cole and the Commotions
Logan
Loki
Lotus Eater
Love and Money
Lucia & The Best Boys

M
Man Must Die
The Marmalade
Helen Marnie of Ladytron
John Martyn
Frankie Miller
Middle of the Road
Midge Ure of Ultravox, Slik, Rich Kids and Visage
Mogwai
Hudson Mohawke
Mother and the Addicts
Jim Mullen

N
Natural Acoustic Band
Niteworks
No Way Sis

O
One Dove
Orange Juice
The Orchids

P
The Pastels
The Phantom Band
Owen Paul
The Poets
El Presidente
PAWS (band)
Prides
Primal Scream

R
Chris Rainbow
Eddi Reader of Fairground Attraction
Maggie Reilly
Remember Remember

S
Sensational Alex Harvey Band
Set the Tone
Shitdisco
The Silencers
Simple Minds
Slam
Slik
Jimmy Somerville
Sons and Daughters
SOPHIE
Spirea X
Sputniks Down
Stapleton
Al Stewart
Stone the Crows
Strawberry Switchblade
Hamish Stuart of The Average White Band
The Supernaturals
Swanee

T
Texas
Travis
Twin Atlantic
Telstar Ponies
Toy Mountains

U
Uncle John & Whitelock
Unkle Bob
Urusei Yatsura

V
The Vaselines

W
The Wake
Bobby Wellins
Eric Woolfson

Y
Yashin
Alexander Young
Angus Young of AC/DC
George Young
John Paul Young
Malcolm Young of AC/DC
Stevie Young

Z
Zoey Van Goey

See also
List of Scottish musicians

References

Bands
Bands

Lists of bands
Lists of British musicians by location